Kuzmin may refer to:

Kuzmin (Sremska Mitrovica), a village in Serbia
Kuzmyn, a village in Ukraine
Kuźmina, a village in Poland
Kuzmin (surname)